Juha-Pekka Inkeröinen (born 23 November 1988) is a Finnish football player currently playing for RoPS.

References
 Guardian Football

1988 births
Living people
Finnish footballers
Rovaniemen Palloseura players
Association football midfielders